Loerbeek is a village in the eastern Netherlands, near the German border. It's close to Beek and Nieuw-Dijk. There's a big forest called Bergherbos, where people can walk, mountain-bike and ride horse.

It was first mentioned in 1240 as Loberke. The etymology is unknown.

Gallery

References 

Populated places in Gelderland
Montferland